La Pelicana Airport is an airstrip serving Combarbalá, a small town in the Coquimbo Region of Chile.

There is mountainous terrain in all quadrants, nearby rising terrain to the north.

See also

Transport in Chile
List of airports in Chile

References

External links
OpenStreetMap - Cogoti
OurAirports - La Pelicana
FallingRain - La Pelicana Airport

Airports in Coquimbo Region